National LambdaRail (NLR) was a , high-speed national computer network owned and operated by the U.S. research and education community. In November 2011, the control of NLR was purchased from its university membership by a billionaire Patrick Soon-Shiong.  NLR ceased operations in March 2014.

Goals
The goals of the National LambdaRail project are:
To bridge the gap between leading-edge optical network research and state-of-the-art applications research;
To push beyond the technical and performance limitations of today’s Internet backbones;
To provide the growing set of major computationally intensive science (often termed e-Science) projects, initiatives and experiments with the dedicated bandwidth, deterministic performance characteristics, and/or other advanced network capabilities they need; and
To enable creative experimentation and innovation that characterized facilities-based network research during the early years of the Internet.

Description
NLR uses fiber-optic lines, and is the first transcontinental 10 Gigabit Ethernet network.  Its high capacity (up to 1.6 Tbit/s aggregate), high bitrate (40 Gbit/s implemented; planning for 100 Gbit/s underway) and high availability (99.99% or more), enable National LambdaRail to support demanding research projects.  Users include NASA, the National Oceanic and Atmospheric Administration, Oak Ridge National Laboratory, and over 280 research universities and other laboratories.  In 2009 National LambdaRail was selected to provide wide-area networking for U.S. laboratories participating in research related to the Large Hadron Collider project, based near Geneva, Switzerland.

It is primarily oriented to aid terascale computing efforts and to be used as a network testbed for experimentation with large-scale networks.  National LambdaRail is a university-based and -owned initiative, in contrast with the Abilene Network and Internet2, which are university-corporate sponsorships.  National LambdaRail does not impose any acceptable use policies on its users, in contrast to commercial networks.  This gives researchers more control to use the network for these research projects. National LambdaRail also supports a production layer on its infrastructure.

Links in the network use dense wavelength-division multiplexing (DWDM), which allows up to 64 individual optical wavelengths to be used (depending on hardware configuration at each end) separated by 100 GHz spacing. At present, individual wavelengths are used to carry traditional OC-X (OC3, OC12, OC48 or OC192) time-division multiplexing circuits or Ethernet signals for Gigabit Ethernet or 10 Gigabit Ethernet.

National LambdaRail was founded in 2003 and in 2004 its national, advanced fiber optic network was completed.  In addition to being the first transcontinental, production 10 Gigabit Ethernet network, National LambdaRail was also the first intelligently managed, nationwide peering and transit program focused on research applications.

In 2008, a company named Darkstrand purchased capacity on NLR for commercial use.
By the end of the year the Chicago-based company was having trouble raising funding due to the Great Recession.
On May 24, 2012 the NLR network operations center services were transferred to the  Corporation for Education Network Initiatives in California.
In October 2009 Glenn Ricart was named president and CEO.
On September 7, 2010 Ricart announced his resignation.

In November 2011 the control of NLR was purchased from its university membership by a billionaire Patrick Soon-Shiong for $100M, who indicated his intention to upgrade NLR infrastructure and repurpose portions of it to support an ambitious healthcare project through NantHealth. The upgrade never took place. NLR ceased operations in March 2014.

Member organizations 
Members of National LambdaRail are state or regional optical networks, which provide connectivity to the individual universities and laboratories using NLR. NLR has 13 members which enable more than 280 research universities and government laboratories to connect to NLR.  The following is a list, from the official National LambdaRail web site , of LambdaRail member organizations.

 The Corporation for Education Network Initiatives in California
Florida LambdaRail
Front Range GigaPop / University Corporation for Atmospheric Research
Lonestar Education and Research Network (LEARN)
North Carolina Light Rail
Oak Ridge National Laboratory (ORNL)
Oklahoma State Regents for Higher Education
Pacific Northwest Gigapop
Pittsburgh Supercomputing Center (University of Pittsburgh/Carnegie Mellon University)
Southeastern Universities Research Association
Southern Light Rail
The Virginia Tech Foundation/Mid Atlantic Terascale Partnership
 University of New Mexico (on behalf of the State of New Mexico)

References

Academic computer network organizations
Internet in the United States
Science and technology in the United States